"Over Now" is a song by Scottish DJ and producer Calvin Harris and Canadian singer the Weeknd, released on 28 August 2020 through Sony Music. The song was first teased by the Weeknd in a virtual concert shortly prior to the song's announcement.

Background
The collaboration was teased by the Weeknd on 20 August via an Instagram post in which he posted an old photo of him and Harris having drinks backstage at the Coachella festival. Harris also previewed a "funky", "smooth" R&B track in an Instagram story, which music critics at the time attributed to the Weeknd's falsetto. Both artists then took to social media on 22 August to confirm the song's title and release, alongside various promotional posters. "Over Now" was noted as being the same unreleased song the Weeknd shared on a TikTok live stream prior to the song's announcement.
The song marks the first collaboration between the pair and is Harris' first release as Calvin Harris since his January 2019 single "Giant", as he has released 4 EPs and a single, "Live Without Your Love", under his alter-ego Love Regenerator between the releases of "Giant" and "Over Now". The official cover art was revealed on 25 August via the artists' respective social medias.

Charts

Certifications

Release history

References

2020 songs
2020 singles
Calvin Harris songs
Songs written by Calvin Harris
The Weeknd songs
Songs written by the Weeknd
Song recordings produced by the Weeknd
Songs written by Frank Dukes
Song recordings produced by Frank Dukes
Songs written by Doc McKinney
British contemporary R&B songs
Sony Music singles
Songs written by Dylan Wiggins
Songs written by DaHeala